I Like This Temper is Slovakian alternative rock group Lavagance's fourth studio album, with five tracks plus the radio mix of "Blood".

The songs were chosen by Lavagance and completely redone with Eddie Stevens, who produced the album. The mixing was done by Stevens in his London studio. The experimental album was then mastered in Amsterdam, and like their previous albums, was made available for free download from their website.

Track list
 "Attraction"
 "Blood"
 "Temper
 "It Happened Last Night"
 "She is the..."
 "Blood" (radio edit)

Reception
After its release, the single, "Blood", spent several weeks at the top of the Alternative Chart on the Slovak Rádio FM.

Personnel
 Marek Rakovický - vocals, guitar, programming, keyboards
 Vincent Susol - bass guitar, vocals
 Viliam Bujnovský - keyboards, programming
 Marek Gregor - drums, vocals, programming
 Mario Smashing - guitar, vocals, keyboards
 Peter Rakovický - keyboards, programming & sound engineering

References

Lavagance albums
2009 albums